Trần Thị Thu Thảo (born 15 January 1993) is a Vietnamese footballer who plays as a midfielder for Women's Championship club Hồ Chí Minh City I and the Vietnam women's national team.

Club career
Trần Thị Thu Thảo has played for Hồ Chí Minh City in Vietnam.

International career
Trần Thị Thu Thảo capped for Vietnam at senior level during the 2020 AFC Women's Olympic Qualifying Tournament.

References

External links

1993 births
Living people
Vietnamese women's footballers
Women's association football midfielders
Vietnam women's international footballers
21st-century Vietnamese women